Synapturanus rabus is a species of frog in the family Microhylidae.
It is found in Colombia, Ecuador, possibly Brazil, and possibly Peru.
Its natural habitats are subtropical or tropical moist lowland forests and freshwater springs.
It is threatened by habitat loss.

References

rabus
Amphibians of Colombia
Amphibians of Ecuador
Amphibians described in 1976
Taxonomy articles created by Polbot